"The Rip" is a song by English band Portishead. It was released on 9 June 2008 as the second single from their third studio album, Third (2008). The animated music video for the song made by Nick Uff was first broadcast on 12 May 2008, on the band's website. The song peaked at number 98 in France and was listed at #199 on Pitchfork's top 500 songs of the 2000s. Garrett Kamps of The Village Voice called the song "so good it may have been worth waiting 10 years for".

The song has been used in an advertisement campaign for the Gucci Bloom line of perfume.

Track listing
"The Rip" – 4:30
"Silence" (Portishead live on Current TV) (EU digital download bonus track; Japan iTunes Store bonus track) – 4:37
"The Rip" (EU and Japan iTunes Store bonus video) – 4:10

Charts

References

External links
Official site
Village Voice review
Jonny Greenwood and Thom Yorke's acoustic cover of The Rip on YouTube

2008 singles
Portishead (band) songs
Songs written by Geoff Barrow
Songs written by Beth Gibbons
Songs written by Adrian Utley
2008 songs
Folktronica songs
Krautrock songs